Ellin & Kitson partnership was formed in New York City by two English sculptors from Yorkshire, England in early 1879.  Prior to this date they were working as Robert Ellin Company. They advertised their business as architectural sculptors concentrating on churches.

The elder was Robert Ellin, born 1837; the younger was John William Kitson, born in 1846. According to the Kitson family, it was Ellin who first came to the United States and then encouraged Kitson to follow.  Their first known collaboration was a mahogany breakfront entered into a juried show for the United States Centennial held in Philadelphia in 1876.  According to Kitson family history, they entered their work as Americans, thinking it would set them apart from the many English entries.  At the time of the Centennial celebration, their firm had been awarded the execution of the Astor Memorial Altar. The breakfront was very noted and won a prize.  In addition to the breakfront, they also entered various church furnishings, which was their company emphasis.  Kitson family oral history tells of many trips which William took to South America to personally select the mahogany and other woods for various projects.

Ellin & Kitson as well as Ellin, Kitson & Co worked with many famous architects and designers
of the time: Thomas Wisedell, Robert J Withers, Frederick Law Olmsted, Richard Morris Hunt, J. Cleaveland Cady, George B. Post to name a few.

Some of the buildings they were involved with are: W E Dodge house, Jamees A Roosevelt house; the Tilden home, the William Kissam Vanderbilt house, the Cornelius Vanderbilt house, the Marquand mansion; Collis P Huntington house; Senator Dodge of Montana House in NYC;  the Equitable Insurance Building; Mutual Life Insurance Company (Nassau Street); Prudential Life Insurance Building;  Marble House, Newport, Rhode Island; The Breakers, Newport RI; the Goelet house, Newport RI; Chapel of the Good Shepherd, General Theological Seminary [New York City]; Grace Church, Trinity Church Astor Redoes, Trinity Chapel, all in New York City; St. Thomas' Church, Mamaroneck, Westchester County, New York; new Old South Church, Boston; Small Gothic Church designed by J Cleveland Cady somewhere up the Hudson River. Additionally, they constructed a vast number of buildings at the 1892 Chicago Exposition.

Earlier work circa 1867 by Ellin with James Whitehouse are Panels on the Mall in Central Park. Earlier independent work of William Kitson in 1870 on the capitals of the interior columns of Second Presbyterian Church in Philadelphia.

In addition to various tradesmen employed by the firm, William's younger brother Samuel James Kitson was often involved, especially when fine sculptures were to be a part of the project. Samuel Kitson did not depend on commissions from the firm as he secured commissions  on his own ability and artistic talent Another younger brother Harry (Henry Hudson Kitson) apprenticed with the firm until 1882 when he attend art school in Paris, France.
Following the death of William Kitson in 1888, the firm was known as Ellin, Kitson and Company, omitting the ampersand with the John William Kitson Estate remaining as a silent partner.  In 1902 the partnership of Ellin, Kitson & Co was dissolved. Robert Ellin then formed another  partnership with J W Harrison as Ellin Kitson and Company.  Following Robert Ellin's death in February 1904, the firm continued under the guidance of J W Harrison.  As late as 1913, Ellin Kitson and Company were advertising their services in trade magazines.

Columbia University has in their special collections department a style book attributed to Ellin & Kitson.

References
Manufacturer and Builder, October 1884, pg 228 "A Fine Stone Structure"  [cdl.library.cornell.edu]
Trow City Directory 1879 Page 59
Trow City Directory 1901 Page 144
Polk's New York Co-partnerships ... 1909 Page 230
 The World's Fair At Chicago. III. The Decoration Of The Exposition. Author: Millet, F. D. Publication Info: Scribner's Magazine Volume 0012 Issue 6 (December, 1892) / Volume 12, Issue: 6, December, 1892, pp. 692–709 [cdl.library.cornell.edu]
THE VILLARD HOUSES William C. Shopsin, AIA and Mosette Glaser Broderick 1980 Viking Press pages 47, 64
IN PURSUIT OF BEAUTY Metropolitan Museum of Art - Rizzoli 1986, Pages 110, 120-121, 123, 425, 486 note references pg 425
 Stone; an Illustrated Magazine Frank W Holt Publishers Vol 24 January 1902 - June 1902 Editorial "The Founder of American Architectural Decoration" Pages 342-345
Charles Schribner's Sons NYC 1893 "Some Artists at the Fair" #38
Surogettes Court NYC Will of John William Kitson, dod Feb 3, 1888
 "History of Granite Industry in St. George, NB" Charlotte County Historical Society No 46", Miss M. Eulalia O"Halloran, page 8
 New York Times Oct 3, 1884 "Remarkable Building Work: Where the Stone of the Mutual Life Building Came From"
The Commissioners of Patents Journal England September 15, 1874
New York NY Tribune May 4, 1902 Page 2, American Art Industries Wood Carving
Stone; an Illustrated Magazine - Google Books Result 1894 Vol 9 Page 470
Stone; an Illustrated Magazine - Google Books Result 1902 Vol 24-Editorial "The Founder of American Architectural Decoration" pages 342-345
Real Estate Record and Builders' Guide August 10, 1901 Mortgages and Assignments Borough of Manhattan
George Titus Ferris "Gems of the Centennial Exhibition" 1877 D. Appleton & Co, NYC Pages 136-139
The Critic: An Illustrated Monthly Review of Literature, Art 1893 Vol 22-23 Pages 391-2
Building Trades Employers Association Vol 5 1904 page 56
Mining and Scientific Press, Volumes 77-78 1898-99, May 20, 1899 Page 611
Great Britain Patent Office "The Commissioner of Patents Journal" August 11, 1874 Page 2466
Official Gazette of the United States Patent Office, May 29, 1900 Pages 776-7
Tariff Hearings before the Committee on Ways and Means of the House of Representatives, Sixtieth Congress 1908-1909
Columbia University Press, NYC, W. Craven, Stanford White: Decorator in Opulence and Dealer in Antiquitie  newspapers.rawson.lib.mi.us/enterprise/CCE_1895_A%20(E)/issues/06-14- 1895_6.pdf "BIGGEST BRONZE CASTING"
Yearbook of the Architectural League and Catalogue Vol 14 Pages 133, 137
George Titus Ferris, Gems of the Centennial Exhibition D Appleton & Co Publishers NYC 1877 Pages 136-139

American woodcarvers
Construction and civil engineering companies of the United States
American architectural sculptors
American male sculptors